The spot-breasted parrotbill (Paradoxornis guttaticollis) is a species of bird in the family Paradoxornithidae. It is found in Bangladesh, China, India, Laos, Myanmar, Thailand, and Vietnam.

References

Robson, C. (2007). Family Paradoxornithidae (Parrotbills) pp. 292 – 321   in; del Hoyo, J., Elliott, A. & Christie, D.A. eds. Handbook of the Birds of the World, Vol. 12. Picathartes to Tits and Chickadees. Lynx Edicions, Barcelona.

External links
 Spot-breasted parrotbill videos on the Internet Bird Collection

spot-breasted parrotbill
Birds of China
Birds of Northeast India
Birds of Laos
Birds of Myanmar
Birds of Yunnan
Birds of Vietnam
spot-breasted parrotbill
Taxonomy articles created by Polbot